Philip Joseph Kessel Jr. (born October 2, 1987) is an American professional ice hockey winger for the Vegas Golden Knights of the National Hockey League (NHL). He has previously played for the Boston Bruins, Toronto Maple Leafs, Pittsburgh Penguins, and Arizona Coyotes. Kessel is a two-time Stanley Cup champion, winning back-to-back championships with the Penguins in 2016 and 2017.

Kessel is a product of the USA Hockey National Team Development Program as an identified elite player under the age of 18. He finished his amateur career playing collegiate hockey in the NCAA for the University of Minnesota in the Western Collegiate Hockey Association (WCHA). He was then selected fifth overall in the 2006 NHL Entry Draft by the Boston Bruins. After his rookie season, 2006–07, he was awarded the Bill Masterton Memorial Trophy for overcoming testicular cancer while continuing his professional career. In 2009, Kessel was traded from Boston to the Toronto Maple Leafs where he spent six seasons before being dealt to the Pittsburgh Penguins in 2015. Kessel won his first and second Stanley Cup championships with the Pittsburgh Penguins in back to back seasons with wins over the San Jose Sharks and the Nashville Predators, respectively.

Kessel is known as a natural goal scorer, having totaled 400 goals over the course of his career, and for holding the all-time NHL ironman record for the most consecutive games played, with 1,000+; during the 2020–21 season, he became the fifth player ever to record 900 consecutive games played. During the 2022–23 season, Kessel passed Keith Yandle's streak as the longest in NHL history on October 25, 2022, after playing his 990th consecutive game; several weeks later, on November 17, Kessel became the first player in NHL history to play 1,000 consecutive games. He is one of two players in the NHL with an active streak (to date) of over 500 consecutive games, alongside Brent Burns.

Kessel plays internationally for the United States, and has played at three World Championships and the 2010 and 2014 Winter Olympics, winning a silver medal in 2010 and being named the top forward in 2014.

Playing career

Amateur
Kessel played youth hockey with the AAA Madison Capitols in his hometown of Madison, Wisconsin. An offensive standout from a young age, Kessel put up 286 points (176 goals and 110 assists) in 86 games with his AAA bantam squad in 2001–02. He followed up on that effort the next year with the Capitols under-18 team where, during the 2002–03 season, he produced 158 points (113 goals and 45 assists) in 71 games. Kessel credits former Capitols coach and 1980 U.S. Olympian Bob Suter for becoming the player he is today.

For the 2003–04 season, Kessel moved to Ann Arbor, Michigan, to join the United States National Team Development Program's U17 squad. He set NTDP records for goals (52) for a U17–18 players. During the 2004–05 season, Kessel played full-time on the U18 team scoring 52 goals and 98 points, both of which were, at the time, records for an U18 player. His points record was surpassed by Patrick Kane who recorded 102 points and same 52 goals in the next 2005–06 season. Almost 15 years later, on March 15, 2019, another Wisconsin phenom Cole Caufield scored a career-high six goals to reach 105 and pass Kessel's career 104 goals from 2003–05 for the NTDP lead.

Kessel graduated from Pioneer High School in 2005. However, because his birthday falls after September 15, he was not eligible for the NHL Entry Draft that year. After finishing his two years at NTDP, Kessel enrolled at University of Minnesota on a sports scholarship and played for the Golden Gophers men's ice hockey team for the 2005–06 season. His first collegiate goal came on a penalty shot, marking the first time in team history that a player scored his first career goal on a penalty shot. As a rookie freshman, Kessel finished second on the team in scoring with 51 points (18 goals and 33 assists) in 39 games. He was named the 2005–06 WCHA Rookie of the Year and named to the 2005–06 All-Rookie Team.

Kessel was drafted fifth overall by the Boston Bruins in the 2006 NHL Entry Draft. He subsequently signed an entry level contract with the team on August 17, 2006, thereby forgoing his final three years of college eligibility.

Professional

Boston Bruins (2006–2009)
On August 17, 2006, the Bruins announced that they had signed Kessel to a three-year, entry-level contract worth the rookie maximum of $850,000.

On December 11, 2006, Kessel's family announced that he was hospitalized for a reason unrelated to hockey, and WBZ-TV reported that Kessel was diagnosed with a form of testicular cancer. On December 16, Kessel was pronounced cancer-free. On January 5, 2007, he was assigned to the Providence Bruins, Boston's American Hockey League (AHL) affiliate, for conditioning purposes and then recalled on January 7. Kessel returned to the Bruins lineup on January 9, against the Ottawa Senators, after missing only 11 regular season games following cancer surgery.

Kessel was named to the 2007 NHL YoungStars Game in Dallas on January 23, 2007. He recorded a hat-trick (including a powerplay goal, plus the game-winner) and an assist during a 9–8 Eastern Conference victory. While Kessel was not among top rookies in goals or assists, for the 2006–07 season he was second among rookies with four shootout goals (in seven attempts). Each was a game-deciding goal.

At the conclusion of the season, Kessel was voted by Boston sports writers as the team's candidate for the Bill Masterton Memorial Trophy after battling testicular cancer.
At the 2007 NHL Awards Ceremony at the Elgin Theatre in Toronto, Kessel was officially selected as the recipient of the 2007 Masterton Trophy.

For the 2007–08 season Kessel led the league with 5 game-deciding shootout goals (out of 13 attempts in shootouts). He set a Bruins career record with 9 shootout-deciding goals, surpassed by Patrice Bergeron seven years later.

Kessel scored the first Bruins goal of the 2008–09 season, in a 5–4 Bruins victory against the Colorado Avalanche. Kessel ended the regular season on a high note, scoring his second career hat-trick in the April 12, 2009, 6–2 visitors' victory against the New York Islanders, and amassing the highest number of NHL regular season goals so far in his career with 36, the most on the Bruins that season. He also tied Ed Olczyk for longest point streak by an American-born NHL player (18 games, 14 goals and 14 assists for 28 points during streak) in late 2008. It is now the third-longest such point streak after Patrick Kane's 26-game streak in late 2015 and 20-game streak in the beginning of 2019.

Kessel played an integral role in Boston's run during the 2009 Stanley Cup playoffs, leading the Bruins with six goals before losing to the Carolina Hurricanes in the Eastern Conference Semifinals in seven games. After the playoffs, it was reported that Kessel would need off-season shoulder surgery to repair an injury most likely incurred during a 2–0 loss to the Columbus Blue Jackets. The surgery was successfully performed during the off-season, with recuperation forcing Kessel to miss the start of the 2009–10 season.

Toronto Maple Leafs (2009–2015)
On September 18, 2009, the Bruins traded Kessel to the Toronto Maple Leafs in exchange for a 2010 first-round pick (Tyler Seguin), a 2010 second-round pick (Jared Knight) and a 2011 first-round pick (Dougie Hamilton). Immediately afterward, the Leafs signed him to a five-year, $27 million contract.

Kessel, however, was sidelined for the first month of the season with a shoulder injury incurred the year before that required surgery. Finally, on November 3, 2009, Kessel made his much-anticipated debut as a Leaf against the Tampa Bay Lightning. He had a total of ten shots on goal in the game, a career-high, though he did not record any assists or goals. Despite not recording any points and his team falling 2–1 to the Lightning in overtime, Kessel was named the third star of the game. He scored his first goal as a Maple Leaf just four days later in a 5–1 win over the Detroit Red Wings at the Air Canada Centre.

December 5, 2009, marked the first time that Kessel played against his former team, the Bruins, at TD Garden. His return to Boston was marked with thunderous taunting chants of his name by his former home crowd, along with a chorus of boos every time he had possession of the puck. Kessel was on the ice for the first three of the seven goals that Boston scored in their 7–2 victory, eventually finishing the game a −3 plus-minus with two shots on the night. After the game, Kessel said in a post-game interview on NESN that the fans' reaction "did not affect [him]." He did state, however, that it was the "worst game [he] had played in a while", and that he needed to "play better."

After the 2010 NHL Winter Classic between the Boston Bruins and Philadelphia Flyers on January 1, 2010, USA Hockey announced that Kessel, along with then-Maple Leaf teammate Mike Komisarek, made the Olympic roster to represent Team USA at the 2010 Winter Olympics. (Komisarek, however, would miss the Olympics due to injury). In six games at the Olympics, Kessel tallied a goal and an assist as the U.S. won a silver medal, falling to Canada in the final.

On April 2, 2011, Kessel posted his third consecutive 30-goal season, reaching the mark after scoring against the Ottawa Senators. At the time, he was among eight other NHL players, including League stars Sidney Crosby and Alexander Ovechkin, who have scored 30 goals or more in a season three times since the 2008–09 regular season.

Kessel had another strong start to a season in 2011–12, scoring his first hat-trick as a Maple Leaf (a career third) in just the team's second game of the season. He would go on to finish the month as the NHL's top scorer and was subsequently named the NHL's First Star of the Month for October. That season, Kessel was once again named an NHL All-Star and was selected to Team Chara in the eighth round of the Fantasy Draft by Toronto linemate Joffrey Lupul.

On February 6, 2012, Kessel reached the 300-point plateau after a three-point performance against the Edmonton Oilers. The next day, he hit the 30-goal mark for the fourth-straight year (third-straight as a Maple Leaf) after beating Ondřej Pavelec of the Winnipeg Jets. Later that month, Kessel continued to reach milestones, scoring his 65th point of the season (which broke his old career-high) in a 2–1 loss to the San Jose Sharks.

An NHL player's poll conducted by Sports Illustrated and released in February 2012 named Kessel "the easiest (player) to intimidate" in the NHL. He was named by 15% of NHL player respondents while Vancouver Canucks' Daniel and Henrik Sedin were next with 8%. The results were based on the input of 145 NHL players who responded to Sports Illustrated'''s survey. The poll drew controversy from many, including then-Toronto General Manager Brian Burke due to the inflammatory nature of the question and which players were polled (i.e. no one in the Maple Leafs' or Canucks organizations agreed to have players complete the survey).

In another player survey, this one by The Hockey News, Kessel was ranked as the 16th best player in the League by his peers. The results in this survey were based on responses from five players from each of the 30 NHL teams. Players were not allowed to vote for members of their own team.

On March 31, 2012, Kessel scored his 37th goal of the season in a 4–3 win over the Buffalo Sabres, eclipsing his career-high of 36 set with Boston. He finished the season with 37 goals and 82 points, both new career-highs, and both placed him sixth in the NHL. After the season he was awarded the Molson Cup for the third straight year since becoming a Maple Leaf.

Kessel began the 2012–13 season with his longest goal drought to begin a season at ten games, finally breaking the slump after scoring the game-winning goal against Winnipeg on February 7, 2013. On April 20, 2013, in a 4–1 win against Ottawa in which Kessel recorded two assists, he and the Maple Leafs clinched a playoff spot in the 2013 Stanley Cup playoffs. This marked the first time Kessel had made it to the playoffs since his move to the Maple Leafs and ended a seven-year playoff drought for the club dating back before the 2004–05 NHL lockout. To conclude the season, Kessel scored ten goals and seven assists for 17 points over his last ten games to retake the scoring lead for Toronto. Kessel would go on to finish seventh in NHL scoring, posting his second consecutive point-per-game season.

On October 1, 2013, Kessel signed an eight-year, $64 million contract extension, which was the largest contract in Maple Leafs' franchise history at the time. During the 2013–14 campaign, in the week of October 21 and 27, Kessel scored in all three of Toronto's games. In the Maple Leafs' first game, he scored his fourth career hat-trick, including the game-winner, in a 4–2 victory of the Anaheim Ducks. He then scored in Toronto's next game, a 5–2 loss to the Columbus Blue Jackets, and concluded the week by recording a goal and an assist in a 4–1 victory over the Pittsburgh Penguins. For his efforts, Kessel was named Second Star of the Week after leading the NHL with five goals scored in that timeframe. Kessel continued his successful week with a two-goal, two-assist effort against Edmonton in a 4–0 Maple Leafs victory.

After the 2014 NHL Winter Classic, in which Toronto defeated Detroit Red Wings 3–2 in a shootout, it was announced that Kessel, along with teammate James van Riemsdyk, had been named to Team USA's roster for participation in the 2014 Winter Olympics in Sochi.
On February 1, 2014, Kessel scored his fifth career hat-trick, which was also his 30th goal of the season, marking the fifth time he has had scored at least 30 goals in one season in the NHL. On February 15, he scored another hat-trick, this time for Team USA against Slovenia during the 2014 Winter Olympics. He finished with five goals and three assists for eight points in six games to lead the tournament in scoring, was named to the tournament All-Star Team and earned Best Forward honors. Despite the personal success, however, Kessel and the U.S. lost the bronze medal game against Finland, falling 5–0. In the end of the 2014 NHL year he led Toronto in goals, assists and points for the third consecutive season.

Throughout the 2014–15 season Toronto slid down in the Eastern Conference standings: head coach Randy Carlyle was fired on January 15, 2015, after Toronto lost seven of their last ten games, and interim head coach Peter Horachek won just nine of the last 42 games of the season. Even Kessel did not have a significant impact on his personal statistics, collected only 61 points (the most among Maple Leafs).

Pittsburgh Penguins (2015–2019)
After weeks of trade rumors, on July 1, 2015, the Toronto Maple Leafs, who were entering a rebuilding phase, traded Kessel, Tyler Biggs, Tim Erixon, and a conditional second round draft pick to the Pittsburgh Penguins in a blockbuster deal for Kasperi Kapanen, Scott Harrington, Nick Spaling, and conditional first- (Sam Steel) and third-round (James Greenway) draft picks. Toronto also retained $1.2 million of Kessel's salary for the remaining seven seasons of his contract.

Kessel scored his first regular season goal as a Penguin on October 10, while playing Arizona in the team's second game of the 2015–16 season. On December 19, 2015, Kessel played his 500th consecutive game, becoming the 23rd player in league history to reach this milestone.

On June 12, 2016, Kessel won the Stanley Cup after defeating the San Jose Sharks in six games. Kessel played on a line with Nick Bonino and Carl Hagelin that was the most effective line for the Penguins in the playoffs (called the HBK line). Kessel led the Penguins in playoff scoring with 10 goals and 22 points and also led the team in shots with 98. Kessel narrowly missed winning the Conn Smythe Trophy as playoff MVP, falling short of teammate and captain Sidney Crosby by three points. In the 5-3-1 point distribution scheme based on the ballots of 18 voters, Crosby had nine first-place votes, five second-place votes, and three third-place votes, while Kessel had seven first-place votes, eight second-place votes, and one third-place vote.

As a member of the 2015–16 Stanley Cup winning team, Kessel was entitled to spend a day with the Stanley Cup. For his day with the cup, Kessel initially brought the cup to his hometown of Madison, Wisconsin, where he celebrated with family and friends. He then returned to Toronto, bringing the trophy to SickKids Hospital to share it with patients and their families. When Kessel won his second championship trophy he took pictures of himself eating hot dogs out of the Stanley Cup.

In the 2017–18 season he scored 92 points, a career high, placed him eighth in the NHL. He also posted a new career-best 58 assists in the season.

On October 11, 2018, during the third Pittsburgh game of the 2018–19 season, Kessel scored his sixth career hat-trick, which occurred as his first natural, and first as a Penguin. From February 1 to March 5, 2019, Kessel did not score a goal in 16 games (however, he collected 11 assists), which was the longest goal-drought in his entire career. On March 19, 2019, Kessel played in his 320th consecutive game for the Penguins, passing Craig Adams for the longest in their history. After the last game of the regular season, Kessel was second in points for Penguins, and led the league with 10 game-winning goals.

Kessel and the Penguins were swept by the New York Islanders in the first round of the 2019 Stanley Cup playoffs in what would be Kessel's final postseason with the Penguins; he scored a goal to go with an assist in the four-game loss.

Arizona Coyotes (2019–2022)
On June 29, 2019, Kessel was traded from Pittsburgh to the Arizona Coyotes along with Dane Birks and a fourth-round pick, in exchange for Alex Galchenyuk and Pierre-Olivier Joseph. On October 12, 2019, Kessel played his 1,000th career NHL game.

On May 7, 2021, Kessel scored his 900th point in the NHL, a breakaway goal against the San Jose Sharks.

Kessel was able to continue his iron man streak through the COVID-19 pandemic, and dressed for the first shift of a March 8, 2022 road game against the Detroit Red Wings before leaving to take a special chartered flight back to Arizona to be present for the birth of his first child. This extended his streak to 956 consecutive games. Kessel had initially intended to play the entire game before leaving, but was encouraged by coach André Tourigny to depart earlier. After being present for the birth of his daughter Kapri, he rejoined the Coyotes on the road less than 48 hours later for a March 10 game against his former team, the Maple Leafs, recording an assist in a 5–4 victory. Teammate Jakob Chychrun deemed the episode "a pretty cool gesture." Maple Leafs star forward Auston Matthews remarked "it's quite a manoeuvre that he pulled. Hats off to him."

On April 2, 2022, Philadelphia Flyers coach Mike Yeo scratched Keith Yandle from the lineup, ending his iron man streak at a record 989 straight games. Kessel took over as the player with the longest active streak.

Vegas Golden Knights (2022–present)
On August 24, 2022, Kessel signed a one-year, $1.5 million contract with the Vegas Golden Knights. As his usual jersey number 81 was already in use on the team by Jonathan Marchessault, Kessel switched to wear number 8 for the first time in his NHL career. On October 24, 2022, Kessel played his 989th consecutive game in the NHL, tying Yandle's iron man streak. He appeared to have scored his 400th goal in that game as well, but it was called back on an offside challenge, though he did manage an assist. On the loss of his potential milestone goal, he remarked that "it is what it is. We scored right after, so it didn't matter." The next night, Kessel officially passed Yandle for the iron man record, skating in his 990th consecutive game, where he scored his 400th goal. On November 17, 2022, Kessel then became the first player in league history to record 1,000 consecutive games played, as the Golden Knights defeated the Coyotes, Kessel's former team, 4–1.

International play

Junior
Kessel represented the United States in international competition for the first time when his under-17 National Team Development Program squad played at the 2004 World U17 Hockey Challenge finishing fourth. He finished the tournament fourth overall in points (10) and second overall in goals (6).

Later in 2004, Kessel played as an underaged player at the IIHF World U18 Championship, where the U.S. won silver. He finished with ten points (seven goals and three assists) in six games, leading the tournament in goals and being named to the tournament all-star team.

During Kessel's 2004–05 campaign with the NTDP, he played for Team USA at the IIHF U20 World Championship held in Grand Forks, North Dakota, where the team ultimately finished fourth. He had four goals and two assists in seven games .

In 2005, Kessel once again participated in the World U18 Championship, this time winning a gold medal. He finished with nine goals and seven assists for 16 points in six games, leading the tournament in all said offensive statistics. Kessel was named the tournament's best forward and was also named to the tournament All-Star Team.

Kessel then played in the 2006 World Junior Championship, where the U.S. finished fourth for the second-straight year. Kessel led the tournament in points (11) and assists (10).

Senior
Kessel made his debut in senior international competition in 2006, when he competed at the 2006 IIHF World Championship in Riga. In seven games, he scored one goal and one assist as the U.S. placed seventh.

Following his rookie year with Boston, Kessel competed at the 2007 IIHF World Championship in Moscow, where the U.S. finished fifth. He improved on his performance at the previous World Championship, scoring two goals and five assists in seven games.

Kessel competed at the World Championship for the third time in the 2008 edition held in Halifax, Nova Scotia, and Quebec City. Again, however, the U.S. underwhelmed, finishing in sixth place. On a personal level, Kessel finished ninth overall in points with ten (six goals and four assists) in seven games.

In 2010, Kessel played for Team USA at the Winter Olympics in Vancouver. The U.S. finished second, winning the silver medal. In six games, Kessel had a goal and an assist.

On January 1, 2014, after the completion of the 2014 Winter Classic, Kessel was announced as a member of the 2014 Olympic Team and went on to compete at the Winter Olympics in Sochi, Russia. Although the US finished out of the medals, Kessel enjoyed individual success, scoring 5 goals and 3 assists in 6 games, leading the tournament in points (8), being named as best forward, and being named to the All-Star Team.

Despite his successful Stanley Cup winning campaign with the Pittsburgh Penguins where he scored 10 goals and 22 points in the playoffs, he was left off the American roster of the 2016 World Cup of Hockey. Following the elimination of Team USA after a 4–2 loss to Team Canada, Kessel tweeted "Just sitting around the house tonight w my dog. Felt like I should be doing something important, but couldn't put my finger on it." This was interpreted by several Team USA players and personnel, including Dean Lombardi, John Tortorella, David Backes, Zach Parise, and Derek Stepan as Kessel jabbing following his snub. Kessel stated that his comments were not directed at anyone, and that he didn't mean any disrespect towards anyone.

Personal life
Phil Kessel is from Verona, Wisconsin. The entire Kessel family features successful athletes. His father, Phil Kessel Sr., a college quarterback at Northern Michigan University, was drafted by the Washington Redskins of the National Football League, spending his first year on the injured reserve and then subsequently being released. Kessel's brother Blake, a defenseman, was drafted by the New York Islanders in the sixth round of the 2007 NHL Entry Draft and last played for the Orlando Solar Bears of the ECHL. Kessel’s sister Amanda also plays hockey, currently with the National Women's Hockey League as well as internationally with the United States with whom she won gold during the Pyeongchang 2018 Winter Olympics. Kessel's cousin, David Moss, played most recently for Switzerland's NLA with the EHC Biel.

An avid poker player in his free time, Kessel often plays high stakes tournaments, casino cash games and home games with his teammates. Although able to play Texas hold 'em well, he prefers to play Pot-limit Omaha, a game he was taught by his father. Kessel has played in the World Series of Poker (WSOP) every year since 2012, entering high stakes tournaments with entry fees as high as $25,000. As of June 2019, Kessel has totaled $17,022 in live tournament winnings, stemming from cashing in six different WSOP tournaments. Kessel is also good friends with professional poker player Daniel Negreanu, who himself has nearly $40 million in live poker tournament winnings.

Kessel's longtime girlfriend Sandra Pereira gave birth to their first child, daughter Kapri Mary Kessel, on March 9, 2022.

Career statistics

Regular season and playoffs

International

NHL All-Star Games

Awards and honors

Records
NHL
 First NHL rookie awarded the Bill Masterton Memorial Trophy
 Most consecutive games played: 1,000 (active)
First player in NHL history to record 1,000 consecutive games played
 Most consecutive games played including playoffs: 1,063 (unofficial, active)

Pittsburgh Penguins
 Most consecutive games played: 328

NHL milestones
 Played first game on October 6, 2006, against Florida
 Recorded first point (an assist on a Brad Boyes goal) on October 7, 2006, against Tampa Bay
 Scored first goal on October 21, 2006, against Buffalo
 Scored first hat-trick on October 12, 2007, against Los Angeles
 Scored first overtime goal on March 11, 2010, against Tampa Bay
 Scored first shorthanded goal on November 26, 2010, against Buffalo
 Scored first goal on a penalty shot on January 7, 2012, against Detroit (vs. Jimmy Howard)
 Recorded career-high 4 assists and 5 points in a game on March 26, 2016, against Detroit
 Recorded 3,000th shot on goal in a game on March 1, 2018, against Boston
 Scored first natural hat-trick on October 11, 2018, against Vegas
 Scored 10th overtime goal on January 18, 2019, against Arizona
 Scored 100th power play goal on March 12, 2019, against Washington
 Registered 300th penalty minute on October 12, 2019, against Colorado
 Recorded 300th power play point on February 2, 2021, against St. Louis
 Recorded 500th assist on March 20, 2021, against Anaheim
 Recorded 900th point on May 7, 2021, against San Jose
 Scored 70th game-winning goal on May 8, 2021, against San Jose
 Played in 1,200th game on April 22, 2022, against Washington
 Played in 990th straight regular-season game (NHL-record) and scored 400th goal on October 25, 2022, against San Jose

See also
 List of NHL players with 500 consecutive games played
 List of NHL players with 1,000 games played

References

External links

 National Hockey League Players' Association (NHLPA)''. Phil Kessel. Retrieved March 16, 2019.

1987 births
Living people
American expatriate ice hockey players in Canada
American men's ice hockey right wingers
Arizona Coyotes players
Bill Masterton Memorial Trophy winners
Boston Bruins draft picks
Boston Bruins players
Ice hockey players from Wisconsin
Ice hockey players at the 2010 Winter Olympics
Ice hockey players at the 2014 Winter Olympics
Medalists at the 2010 Winter Olympics
Minnesota Golden Gophers men's ice hockey players
National Hockey League All-Stars
National Hockey League first-round draft picks
Olympic silver medalists for the United States in ice hockey
People from Verona, Wisconsin
Pittsburgh Penguins players
Providence Bruins players
Sportspeople from Madison, Wisconsin
Stanley Cup champions
Toronto Maple Leafs players
USA Hockey National Team Development Program players
Vegas Golden Knights players